Eunidia strigata is a species of beetle in the family Cerambycidae. It was described by Fahraeus in 1872. It contains the varietas Eunidia strigata var. damarensis.

References

Eunidiini
Beetles described in 1872